Radio Dayz is a 2008 South Korean romantic comedy film written and directed by Ha Ki-ho.

Cast 

Kim Sa-rang as radio announcer and jazz singer, Mari
Ryoo Seung-bum as Producer Lloyd
Lee Jong-hyuk as K
Hwang Bo-ra as Myung-wol
Oh Jung-se as Man-chul
Kim Roi-ha as Mr. Noh
Ko Ah-sung as Sun-deok
Moon Se-yun as  political party member 3

Additional cast members 

Kim Kwang-sik as political party member 1
Park Jung-pyo as  political party member 2
Ko Beun-jin as radio listener
Kim Byeong-man as truck driver
Ahn Sang-tae as postal employee
Kwon Oh-min as delivery boy
Jung Young-ki as Japanese soldier #3
Kim Young-pil as writer
Kim Sa-hee as Hong-Joo
Jeon Su-ji as Madame Kakadyu

References

External links

2008 films
2000s Korean-language films
2008 romantic comedy films
South Korean romantic comedy films
Films set in Korea under Japanese rule
2000s South Korean films